Faustin Mparabanyi (born 1970) is a Rwandan former cyclist. He competed in the individual road race at the 1992 Summer Olympics.

References

1970 births
Living people
Rwandan male cyclists
Olympic cyclists of Rwanda
Cyclists at the 1992 Summer Olympics
Place of birth missing (living people)